Bob Hiltermann is a German-born deaf actor and drummer for Beethoven's Nightmare. He appeared in the film Children of a Lesser God and portrays Walter Novak on the television drama All My Children. Hiltermann is one of the subjects of
See What I'm Saying: The Deaf Entertainers Documentary.

Filmography
 Children of a Lesser God (1986) (Feature Movie) Orin Dennis
 See What I'm Saying: The Deaf Entertainers Documentary (2009) (Documentary Movie) Himself
 The Heart of a Drum Machine (2009) (Documentary Film) Himself
 Hamill, the Movie (2010) (Feature Movie) Purdue Professor
 Love Wins (2018) (Short Film) Dad

Television
 Entertainment Tonight (1985) (CBS) Himself
 Bridge to Silence (1989) (CBS TV Movie) John Lawrence
 Tin Men (1990) (CBS TV Movie) Secret Agent
 Playboy: Erotic Fantasies (1992) (Playboy Channel) Himself
 Sirens (1995) (FOX Series) Guest Star
 Through Deaf Eyes (2007) (PBS) Himself
 All My Children (2007) (ABC Series) Walter Novak
 Cold Case (2008) (CBS Series) Guest Star
 Hawaii Five-0 (2018) (CBS Series) Guest Star

Other works
 He is a writer and director for the award-winning comedy film, This is Ed!!
 He is a star and executive producer in Shut Up and Sign, an educational sign language series.
 He is a drummer for the all-deaf rock band Beethoven's Nightmare.
 He is one of the founding members of the award-winning Deaf West Theatre in Hollywood.
 He toured with the musical theatre MUSIGN.

References

External links 
 
 This is Ed
 Beethoven's Nightmare
 
 

Living people
1952 births
German male film actors
Male deaf actors
German male television actors
German deaf people